The United Nations Democracy Fund (UNDEF) was created by UN Secretary-General Kofi A. Annan in 2005 as a United Nations General Trust Fund to support democratization efforts around the world. It was welcomed  by the General Assembly in the Outcome Document of the 2005 World Summit (A/RES/60/1, paragraphs 136–137) and was created by the UN Secretary- General.

UNDEF supports projects that strengthen the voice of civil society, promote human rights, and encourage the participation of all groups in democratic processes. The large majority of UNDEF funds go to local civil society organizations—both in the transition and consolidation phases of democratization. In this way, UNDEF plays a novel and unique role in complementing the UN's other, more traditional work—the work with Governments—to strengthen democratic governance around the world. UNDEF subsists entirely on voluntary contributions from Governments; in 2015, it reached almost 170 million dollars in contributions and counts more than 40 countries as donors, including many middle- and low-income States in Africa, Asia and Latin America.

Mission

UNDEF supports projects that strengthen the voice of civil society, promote human rights, and encourage the participation of all groups in democratic processes. The large majority of UNDEF funds go to local civil society organizations – both in the transition and consolidation phases of democratization. In this way, UNDEF plays a novel and distinct role in complementing the UN's more traditional work—the work with Governments – to strengthen democratic governance around the world. UN Secretary-General Ban Ki-moon has said  that UNDEF's focus “recognizes a fundamental truth about democracy everywhere -- that it is ultimately the product of a strong, active and vocal civil society. It is such a civil society that fosters responsible citizenship and makes democratic forms of government work.”

UNDEF Support and Funding

In 10 Rounds of Funding so far, UNDEF has supported over 600 projects in more than 100 countries.
 
UNDEF projects are two years long and fall under one or more of seven main areas;

 Women's rights and empowerment / Gender equality
 Community activism
 Rule of Law and human rights
 Youth engagement
 Strengthening civil society capacity for interaction with Government
 Media and freedom of information
 Tools for knowledge
 
UNDEF grants range from US$100,000 to US$300,000. Project proposals are subject to a highly rigorous and competitive selection process, as UNDEF receives an average of about 2,000-3,000 proposals a year and only some 50-60 are selected.

Funding

UNDEF subsists entirely on voluntary contributions  from Governments; in 2010, it surpassed US$110 million in cumulative contributions from 39 countries, including a wide range of non-traditional donor countries in Africa, Asia and Latin America. Contributions to UNDEF qualify as Official Development Assistance, and several donors choose to make multi-year commitments. The United States remain the largest donor.

Governance

As a secretary-General's Trust Fund located within the UN Secretariat, UNDEF falls under the direct authority of the UN Secretary-General. The secretary-general is guided by the UNDEF Advisory Board , which consists of the seven biggest UNDEF donor countries—as of 2010, the United States, India, Japan, Qatar, Germany, Australia and Spain; six States from different regions, chosen for their proven commitment to democracy; two representatives of civil society organizations; and three individuals, including the chair of the board. Since 2007, the chair has been Professor Michael Doyle  of Columbia University, a former UN assistant secretary-general for policy planning under secretary-General Kofi Annan. All members serve for a two-year term.

Within the UN Secretariat, the UNDEF Programme Consultative Group serves as UN inter-agency mechanism that provides expert advice, including on recommendations for project selection. It comprises the Department of Political Affairs, the Department of Peacekeeping Operations, the Office of the High Commissioner for Human Rights, the Peacebuilding Support Office, the UN Development Programme, the UN Development Fund for Women and the UN Office on Drugs and Crime.

To ensure low overheads, the UNDEF office is managed by a small team  of four professionals, led (since 2007) by Roland Rich of Australia, a former diplomat and director of the Centre for Democratic Institutions at Australian National University.

Democracy and the United Nations

For the UN, the importance of democracy and of democratic values was first highlighted in the United Nations Charter, as well as in the Universal Declaration of Human Rights. This in turn has been echoed in a variety of documents – declarations, conventions, covenants, most notably the Covenant on Civil and Political Rights which contains binding obligations on States Parties in respect of elections, freedom of expression and association and assembly and other vital democratic entitlements. In the 1990s, a period characterised by important changes in various parts of the world, democracy has also become a theme of a number of international conferences, and major UN organs, including the General Assembly, pronounced themselves on ways to strengthen democracy.

This process was matched by increasing operational activities in support of democratisation processes by the UN System. In particular, in 2000 the United Nations Development Programme (UNDP) placed democratic governance at the heart of its development cooperation programme, equipping itself with greater internal expertise in this area and channeling a substantial proportion of its core resources in this direction. Another significant development was the establishment in 1992 of the Electoral Assistance Division within the Department of Political Affairs.

The links between international peace and security, sustainable human development and democratization were all embraced again by the international community with the unanimous adoption of the United Nations Millennium Declaration at the Millennium Summit in 2000.

See also 
 Inter-Parliamentary Union
 United Nations Parliamentary Assembly
 National Endowment for Democracy

References

External links
UNDEF Homepage

Organizations established by the United Nations
Democracy promotion